Isaa or ISAA may refer to:

 Inter-Scholastic Athletic Association, an athletic sport organization in the Philippines
 International Size Acceptance Association, a United States-based non-governmental organization